Joseph Leo Koerner (born June 17, 1958) is an American art historian and filmmaker. He is currently the Victor S. Thomas Professor of the History of Art and Architecture and, since 2008, Senior Fellow at the Society of Fellows at Harvard University. Specializing in Northern Renaissance and 19th-century art, Koerner is best known for his work on German art and Early Netherlandish painting.  After teaching at Harvard from 1989 to 1999 (as Professor since 1991), he moved to Frankfurt, where he was Professor of Modern Art History at the Goethe University, and to London, where he held professorships at University College London and the Courtauld Institute before returning to Harvard in 2007. His feature film The Burning Child, a documentary combining personal and cultural history, was released in 2019.

Education
Son of the Vienna-born American painter Henry Koerner, Joseph Koerner was raised in the Squirrel Hill area of Pittsburgh, Pennsylvania, and in Vienna, Austria. He graduated from Taylor Allderdice High School in 1976. He attended Yale University where he received his B.A. in History, the Arts, and Letters in 1980.  His senior thesis, published in German by Suhrkamp Verlag in 1983 with the title Die Suche nach dem Labyrinth ("In Quest of the Labyrinth"), treated the myth of Daedalus and Icarus from Ancient Greek art and literature through James Joyce, with chapters on Ben Jonson, John Milton, and John Keats. An early deconstructive analysis of literary history, the book argued that the story of Daedalus's maze, and the escape from the maze by flight, concerned the problem of time as understood existentially and aesthetically. At Yale he worked for four years as research assistant for historian Peter Gay while Gay was writing his biography of Sigmund Freud and training to be a lay analyst. After a Master of Arts in English Literature at Cambridge University (M.A. 1982), where supervised by Frank Kermode he wrote on Joyce's Finnegans Wake, and then a year studying philosophy and German literature at Heidelberg University with Hans-Georg Gadamer and Peter Pfaff (1983), Koerner received an M.A. (1985) and Ph.D. in art history at the University of California, Berkeley in 1988.  In articles on topics ranging from early Chinese bronzes through Renaissance painting to Romanticism and contemporary art, Koerner focused on problems of meaning and developed a distinctive technique: fine- grained, phenomenological analyses of the effect images have on the beholder, combined with historical accounts of how, when, and why this effect was created.

Career
Koerner used his characteristic technique most extensively in the opening chapters of his first art history book, Caspar David Friedrich and the Subject of Landscape (1990, Winner of the 1992 Mitchell Prize), written while the author was a Junior Fellow at Harvard's Society of Fellows.  During this period, Koerner was a member of the research group Poetik und Hermeneutik in Konstanz in its later phase, 1987–1994, writing on the themes of festival and contingency, or accident. He is currently a member of the Krupp Reimers Forschungsgruppe.

Caspar David Friedrich and the Subject of Landscape became the third volume of Koerner's trilogy on German art.  The first volume, The Moment of Self-Portraiture in German Renaissance Art (1993), studied Albrecht Dürer’s self-portraits and their distortion by Dürer’s disciple, Hans Baldung Grien.  The second volume, The Reformation of the Image (2004), focussed on works by Lucas Cranach, and treated Protestant iconoclasm and its aftermath in painting and architecture.  Among its claims was that, prior to Protestantism, Christian art had iconoclasm built into it, most centrally in the image of the ruined Christ as crossed-out God.  While writing the latter book, Koerner collaborated with Bruno Latour and Peter Weibel on the 2002 exhibition "Iconoclash" at the ZKM in Karlsruhe.  Subsequently, he curated "Earth Tidings," a collaboration between the ZKM and the Staatliche Kunsthalle Karlsruhe, in conjunction with Latour and Weibel's 2020-21 exhibition "Critical Zones." He also was a contributing curator to ZKM's exhibitions "Making Things Public" (2005) and "Reset Modernity" (2016). Koerner has also curated exhibitions of his father's work, including a 1997 retrospective at the Austrian National Gallery.  In the 1990s, he was a frequent contributor to the Frankfurter Allgemeine Zeitung and The New Republic. He has published book and exhibition reviews in The New York Review of Books and creative non-fiction in Granta Magazine, anthologized (2020) in The Best American Essays. He has also written and taught on modern and contemporary artists, including Lucian Freud, Francesco Clemente, Vivienne Koorland, Luc Tuymans, and, most extensively, William Kentridge.

In Great Britain, Koerner is known for his work as writer and presenter of the three-part Northern Renaissance (2006) and  the feature-length Vienna: City of Dreams (2007), both produced in Scotland by the BBC and first broadcast on BBC Four.  A popular speaker, Koerner has delivered the Slade Lectures at Cambridge (2003) and Oxford (2013), the  Getty Lectures at USC (2005), the  Bross Lectures at University of Chicago (2007), the A. W. Mellon Lectures in the Fine Arts at the National Gallery of Art (2008), the Tanner Lectures on Human Values at Cambridge (2012), the E. H. Gombrich Lectures in the Classical Tradition at the Warburg Institute (2016) and the Linbury Lecture at London's National Gallery (2022). His lectures as the Avenali Chair in the Humanities at U. C. Berkeley (2018) treated Hieronymus Bosch and William Kentridge under the title, borrowed from Kentridge, "Art in a State of Siege."  Koerner's most recent publications concern the theme of enmity in the art of Bosch, including the book, based on Koerner's Mellon Lectures and widely reviewed, Bosch and Bruegel:  From Enemy Painting to Everyday Life (2016). In it, he revisited the dual-artist format of The Moment of Self-Portraiture in German Renaissance Art, although with a different trajectory: from Bosch's artistry specializing in hatred to Pieter Bruegel the Elder's art that predicts a modern ethnographic perspective on the human. Pioneering "a way out of the monograph," this framework accords with his conception of the work of art as "inherently doubled," at once embedded in its historical context and anticipating its later receptions. Koerner's recent work concerns art in extreme states and contemporary debates concerning of monuments, which he is currently pursuing partly in collaboration with Professor Sarah Lewis.

A member of the American Academy of Arts and Sciences (since 1995) and the American Philosophical Society (since 2008), and a Fellow of Society of Antiquaries of London (since 2021), Koerner has served on the boards of the Isabella Stewart Gardner Museum, the Yale University Art Gallery, the Frick Art Reference Library, the Warburg Institute, Ralston College, and the American Academy in Berlin. He received a Guggenheim Fellowship for his research on Reformation art (2006-7) and has served as Visiting Professor at the University of Konstanz (1991) and the Kunsthistorisches Institut in Florenz. In 2009, Koerner was one of three recipients of the Andrew W. Mellon Foundation's Distinguished Achievement Award, which funded an academic and creative project on homemaking (geographic, architectural, and psychic) in Vienna from Otto Wagner to the present day.  Based at Harvard, the project produced the 2013 Slade Lectures series "City of Dreams" and the documentary film written, produced, and directed by Koerner, The Burning Child. In 2020 the College Art Association honored him with its 2020 Distinguished Lifetime Achievement Award for Writing on Art.

Personal life
In 2003, Koerner married Margaret K Koerner (born Margaret Lendia Koster), also an art historian; a previous marriage ended in divorce.

Books
Die Suche nach dem Labyrinth—Der Mythos von Daidalos und Ikarus, 1983   
Caspar David Friedrich and the Subject of Landscape, 1990; 2nd ed. rev. and expanded, 2008  
Paul Klee:  Legends of the Sign (with Rainer Crone), 1992 
The Moment of Self-Portraiture in German Renaissance Art, 1993  
Unheimliche Heimat—Henry Koerner 1915–1991, 1997  
The Reformation of the Image, 2004  
Dürer’s Hands, 2006 
Bosch and Bruegel:  From Enemy Painting to Everyday Life, 2016  
Dürer's Mobility, 2022

Filmography
Northern Renaissance (2006) Writer/Presenter, 3-part series, 180 minutes. Premier:  BBC Four (2006).
Vienna:  City of Dreams (2007) Writer/Presenter, 88 minutes. Premiere: BBC Four (2007).
The Burning Child (completed 2018, released 2019) Writer/Presenter/Producer/and Director (with co-director Christian Bruun). 111 minutes.

References

External links
Faculty Website
Vienna Project at Harvard

1958 births
Living people
Alumni of the University of Cambridge
American art historians
Harvard University faculty
Harvard University Department of German faculty
Professors of German in the United States
Writers from Boston
Academics of University College London
Academics of the Courtauld Institute of Art
Writers from Pittsburgh
Writers from Vienna
Yale University alumni
Scholars of Netherlandish art
University of California, Berkeley alumni
Slade Professors of Fine Art (University of Cambridge)
Fellows of the American Academy of Arts and Sciences
Members of the American Philosophical Society
Taylor Allderdice High School alumni
Historians from Pennsylvania
Historians from Massachusetts